William Hopetoun Carnegie, 8th Earl of Northesk (1794–1878), a slave holder in the Colony of Jamaica, was born the son of Admiral William Carnegie, 7th Earl of Northesk and Mary Ricketts on 16 October 1794. He died on 5 December 1878 at age 84.

Personal life
He married Georgiana Maria Elliot, daughter of Admiral Sir George Elliot and Eliza Cecilia Ness, on 14 February 1843 and had two children:

Margaret Mary Adeliza Carnegie (d. 27 September 1871)
Lt.-Col. George John Carnegie, 9th Earl of Northesk (1 December 1843–9 September 1891)

Slave ownership
Northesk was associated with "T71/871 and T71/1378 Special Awards in Trust Westmoreland claim no. 232A & B", he owned 200 slaves in Jamaica and received a £3,529 payment at the time (worth £ in ).

References

1794 births
1878 deaths
William 8
Scottish slave owners
Recipients of payments from the Slavery Abolition Act 1833
Younger sons of earls